The Sooty sand-eel (Bascanichthys bascanoides) is an eel in the family Ophichthidae (worm/snake eels). It was described by Raymond Carroll Osburn and John Treadwell Nichols in 1916. It is a marine, tropical eel which is known from the eastern central Pacific Ocean, including Costa Rica and Mexico.

Due to a lack of known major threats to the species, the IUCN redlist currently lists the Sooty sand-eel as Least Concern.

References

Ophichthidae
Fish described in 1916